Benjamin Ian Swift (born 5 November 1987) is a British professional track and road racing cyclist, who currently rides for UCI WorldTeam . Swift won the scratch race at the 2012 UCI Track Cycling World Championships and the men's elite road race at the 2019 and 2021 British National Road Race Championships. His cousin, Connor Swift, is also an English professional road racing cyclist, and the 2018 British champion.

Biography
Swift was born in Rotherham, South Yorkshire, he began cycling with Mossley Cycle Racing Team aged 12. In 2003, he came second to fellow Olympian Steven Burke in the under 16 national scratch race championship. As a junior rider, Swift competed at the Junior Commonwealth Games, taking bronze in the points race, he won two national titles, the junior points race championship in 2004 followed by the junior scratch race in 2005. He also competed in the senior scratch race in 2005, demonstrating his ability by finishing third to take the bronze medal. Swift began competing internationally, winning several madison events. In 2012 he won the World Championship Men's Scratch Race, becoming Great Britain's first ever World Scratch Champion.

Professional career
He made his professional road debut in August 2007 joining  as a trainee during which time he won the King of the Mountains title in the Tour of Britain.

During 2008 he raced for the British Cycling development team and won his first UCI ranked race. He represented Great Britain in the 2008 Olympic Games road race and at the UCI Road World Championships where he finished fourth in the under 23 race.

Katusha

After the championships he signed a two-year professional contract with the new Russian .

In 2009 he was selected to ride the Giro d'Italia, taking a third-place finish in stage 2. He took his first professional win on the seventh stage of the Tour of Britain, leading Katusha teammate Filippo Pozzato in a one-two finish. Swift spoke with Cyclingnews.com in 2009, describing himself as "an allrounder, who can do well in the Classics and win stages. 'My weakness is in the time trial. I don't like doing them and I'm not really that good at them.'"

Team Sky
Swift joined the newly formed British-based  in January 2010. His transfer to Sky from Team Katusha part way through his contract was instrumental in the Union Cycliste Internationale considering new regulations for the transfer of riders between teams. During his first season with Sky Swift's most significant result came at the Tour de Picardie, at which he won one stage, the general classification, the points classification and best young rider.

2011 saw Swift win his first stage of a UCI World Tour race, winning stage two of the Tour Down Under in Adelaide. Four days later he also won stage six. Swift won Stage 2 of the Tour of California, and took the lead of the race, after Stage 1 was cancelled due to adverse weather. Swift was selected for the Tour de France ahead of Greg Henderson, and finished 6th on Stage 15.

In 2012 Swift focused on track cycling with a view to representing Great Britain in the 2012 Olympic Games. On 4 April, Swift won the Scratch Race at the World Championships to take the rainbow jersey. He finished second in the points race, and joined forces with Geraint Thomas to take silver in the madison.

Swift was scheduled to ride the Giro d'Italia, but was forced to withdraw after suffering a broken shoulder in a crash during a training ride the week before. Although he failed to gain selection from the long list for the British Olympic team, he was picked for the Team Sky squad for the Tour de Pologne, winning the second and fifth stages, as well as wearing that Tour's red-and-white points classification jersey Swift was selected as Sky's sprinter at the 2012 Vuelta a España, and finished second on Stage 18.

In March 2014, Swift achieved one of his biggest results to date by finishing third in Milan–San Remo. In April 2015, Swift crashed out of the newly created Tour de Yorkshire, injuring his shoulder.

On 19 March 2016, Swift finished second in Milan–San Remo, being narrowly outsprinted by Arnaud Démare.

UAE Abu Dhabi
After seven seasons with Sky, in September 2016 Swift announced that he would join  on a two-year deal from 2017 in order to seek more opportunities to ride for himself.

Return to Team Sky
In October 2018, Swift rejoined  for the 2019 season. In June 2019, Swift won the British National Road Race Championships in Norwich, beating team leader Ian Stannard. In September 2019, Swift signed a new contract to remain with Team Ineos until the end of the 2021 season. Swift said he had 'found a renewed enthusiasm and motivation for the sport'.

Major results

2004
 1st  Points race, National Junior Track Championships
2005
 1st  Scratch race, National Junior Track Championships
 1st Rotterdam Junior 2-day madison
1st Nights 1 & 2
 1st Dortmund Under-23 3-day madison
2006
 2nd  Team pursuit, National Track Championships
2007
 1st  Team pursuit, UEC European Under-23 Track Championships
 Giro delle Regioni
1st  Mountains classification
1st Stage 4
 1st  Mountains classification Tour of Britain
 3rd Milan–Busseto
 4th Gran Premio della Liberazione
 5th Road race, UEC European Under-23 Road Championships
 7th La Côte Picarde
2008
 1st Coppa della Pace
 1st GP Coppa Romita
 1st Stage 5 Giro della Valle d'Aosta Mont Blanc
 4th Road race, UCI Under-23 Road World Championships
 4th Road race, UEC European Under-23 Road Championships
 6th Gran Premio Industrie del Marmo
 10th Gran Premio della Liberazione
2009
 1st Stage 7 Tour of Britain
 2nd Nokere Koerse
 8th Gran Premio di Lugano
 10th Gran Premio dell'Insubria-Lugano
2010
 1st  Overall Tour de Picardie
1st  Points classification
1st  Young rider classification
1st Stage 2
 2nd  Team pursuit, UCI Track World Championships
2011
 1st Stage 5 Vuelta a Castilla y León
 1st Stage 5 Tour de Romandie
 1st Stage 2 Tour of California
 3rd Overall Tour Down Under
1st Stages 2 & 6
2012
 UCI Track World Championships
1st  Scratch race
2nd  Points race
2nd  Madison (with Geraint Thomas)
 Tour de Pologne
1st  Points classification
1st Stages 2 & 5
 4th Road race, National Road Championships
2013
 3rd Time trial, National Road Championships
 3rd Trofeo Palma de Mallorca
 5th Trofeo Serra de Tramuntana
 10th Trofeo Campos–Santanyí–Ses Salines
 10th RideLondon–Surrey Classic
2014
 Settimana Internazionale di Coppi e Bartali
1st  Points classification
1st Stages 1a & 1b (TTT)
 1st Stage 5 Tour of the Basque Country
 2nd Road race, National Road Championships
 2nd RideLondon–Surrey Classic
 2nd Trofeo Ses Salines
 3rd Trofeo Muro–Port d'Alcúdia
 3rd Milan–San Remo
 8th Nokere Koerse
2015
 2nd Overall Settimana Internazionale di Coppi e Bartali
1st  Points classification
1st Stage 2
 3rd Trofeo Playa de Palma
 3rd RideLondon–Surrey Classic
 7th Trofeo Santanyi–Ses Salines–Campos
 9th International Road Cycling Challenge
 9th Japan Cup
2016
 1st  Points classification Vuelta a Andalucía
 2nd Milan–San Remo
 7th Overall Tour du Poitou-Charentes
 7th Gran Piemonte
 8th Overall Tour of Britain
 8th Cadel Evans Great Ocean Road Race
2017
 5th Road race, UCI Road World Championships
 5th Road race, National Road Championships
 10th Eschborn–Frankfurt
2019
 1st  Road race, National Road Championships
2020
 8th Kuurne–Brussels–Kuurne
 10th Milano–Torino
2021
 1st  Road race, National Road Championships (Lincoln Grand Prix)
 3rd Grand Prix de Denain
2022
 8th Milano–Torino

Grand Tour results timeline

References

External links

 
 Ben Swift profile at Team Sky
 
 

1987 births
Living people
Cyclists from Yorkshire
Cyclists at the 2008 Summer Olympics
Olympic cyclists of Great Britain
Sportspeople from Rotherham
UCI Track Cycling World Champions (men)
English male cyclists
English track cyclists